Speiermann, Weigel & Co was a manufacturer and wholesaler of bicycles and motorcycles based in Chemnitz, Germany.

History
The company was founded on 1 July 1910 as "Speiermann & Weigel" by merchants Johann Karl Georg August Speiermann and Arno Walter Weigel. Originally trading bicycles and selling sewing machines and spare parts, it was soon renamed in 1912, following William Johannes Walther Schmidt's ownership of the company. In 1924, the company was registered as a trademark of Esweco, and began manufacturing bicycles, motorcycles and batteries.

In November 1950, Speiermann, Weigel & Co was removed from the commercial register.

References

External links
 Information on the history of Speiermann, Weigel & Co 

1910 establishments in Germany
1950 disestablishments in Germany
Cycle manufacturers of Germany
Wholesalers of Germany